{{DISPLAYTITLE:C20H30N4O2}}
The molecular formula C20H30N4O2 (molar mass : 358.48 g/mol, exact mass : 358.236875) may refer to:
 Pracinostat
 ADB-HEXINACA